Čertižné is a village and municipality in the Medzilaborce District in the Prešov Region of far north-eastern Slovakia.

History
In historical records the village was first mentioned in 1431.

Geography
The municipality lies at an altitude of 452 metres and covers an area of 23.729 km². It has a population of about 405 people.

Genealogical resources

The records for genealogical research are available at the state archive "Statny Archiv in Presov, Slovakia"

 Roman Catholic church records (births/marriages/deaths): 1786-1898 (parish B)
 Greek Catholic church records (births/marriages/deaths): 1819-1926 (parish A)

Gallery

See also
 List of municipalities and towns in Slovakia

References

External links
 
 
Čertižné - The Carpathian Connection
http://www.statistics.sk/mosmis/eng/run.html
Surnames of living people in Certizne

A small village of about 390 people (2006).
The number of inhabitants actively being reduced.

Villages and municipalities in Medzilaborce District